The discography of the Eraserheads, a prominent Pinoy rock band of the 1990s, contains seven studio albums, forty-four singles, a live album, four compilation albums, ten music videos and 3 extended plays. Eraserheads was formed in UP Diliman in 1989. Their first three albums, Ultraelectromagneticpop!, Circus and Cutterpillow are critically acclaimed with the first album turning into sextuple platinum upon its release. The band is considered to be one of the best-selling musical acts of the Philippines paving a way for an international career that earned them the "moon man" in the 1997 MTV Video Music Awards.

Albums

Studio albums

Live albums

Compilation albums

Extended plays and demos

Extended plays

Demos

Tribute albums

Music videos

Soundtrack appearances 

 OST Run Barbi Run (Starring Joey De Leon) (1995)
 Run Barbi Run (1995)

Collaborations 
1896 ang Pagsilang (1996)
 "Casa Fantastica"
Francis M's Happy Battle (1996)
 "Unstrung Heroes Duet W/ Francis Magalona"
Ryan Cayabyab The Silver Album (1997)
 "Tuwing Umuulan at Kapiling Ka"
Bandang Pinoy Lasang Hotdog (2001, re-issued 2006)
 "Manila"

Commercial jingles 
Burger Machine (1996
)
 "Tikman"
San Miguel Beer (1996)
 "Homeboys"
Pepsi Megadrive Raffle Promo (1996)
 "Overdrive"
Jack n' Jill Chippy
 "Ligaya" (1996)
 "Bogchi Hokbu" (1997)
Talk N' Text - Anniversarya
 "Toyang Anniversarya"
Sun Cellular
 "Tindahan ni Aling Nena" (2005)
McDonald's (2009)
 "Ang Huling El Bimbo"
Smart Communications MySandbox (2009)
 "Alapaap"
Tang Philippines (2022)
 "Alapaap"

Others 
"Kundi Rin Lang Ikaw" - Sung by True Faith (Composed by Ely Buendia)
"Mga Babae" - Sung by Novia (Composed by Ely Buendia)
"Halo-Halong Digmaan" (War Mix) - Sung by Various Artists (Composed by Ely Buendia and Raimund Marasigan)
"Stone's Throw" - Sung by Sponge Cola (Composed by Ely Buendia)
"Feel So Strange" - Sung by Agot Isidro (Composed by Ely Buendia)

References

Discographies of Filipino artists
Rock music group discographies